The 12th Pan American Games were held in Mar del Plata, Argentina from March 11 to March 26, 1995.

Results by event

See also
Barbados at the 1996 Summer Olympics

Nations at the 1995 Pan American Games
P
1995